Love and Touch is a Tyrone Davis album released in 1976. This was his debut Columbia Records release and second album released in 1976 after last his Dakar Records effort Turning Point!. The album was remastered and expanded through Funkytowngrooves in 2015.

Background

Love and Touch marked the beginning of the collaboration between producer Leo Graham and Tyrone Davis. Singles released include, "Give It Up (Turn It Loose)", which peaked at No. 2 on the Billboard Hot Soul Singles chart and No. 39 on the Billboard Hot 100, and "Close to You", which reached No. 33 on the soul singles chart.

Track listing
 "Give It Up (Turn It Loose)" (Leo Graham) – 4:18
 "Close to You" (Leo Graham, Melvin Koen) – 4:04
 "Why Is It So Hard (To Say You're Sorry)" (Leo Graham, Dennis Miller) – 5:33
 "You're Too Much" (Leo Graham, Dennis Miller) – 3:47
 "Put Your Trust in Me" (Leo Graham) – 5:00
 "Givin' Myself to You" (Leo Graham) – 4:00
 "Wrong Doers" (Leo Graham) – 4:55
 "Beware, Beware" (Leo Graham,  John Sibley) – 4:25

Bonus tracks

Charts

References

External links
 

1976 albums
Tyrone Davis albums
Columbia Records albums
Albums produced by Leo Graham (songwriter)